The 1995–96 Villanova Wildcats men's basketball team represented Villanova University in the 1995–96 season. Led by consensus First team All-American Senior Kerry Kittles, who became and remains Villanova's all-time leading scorer, the  highly ranked Wildcats made their second appearance in the NCAA Tournament since the departure of Rollie Massimino. With an overall record 24-5 and conference record of 14–4, the Wildcats placed second in the Big East Conference, and after reaching the semifinals of the Big East tournament, the team was invited to the NCAA tournament as a 3 seed. In the NCAA tournament, the Wildcats would gain their first tournament win under Fourth Year head coach Steve Lappas, over 14 seed Portland. In the round of 32, the Wildcats would prove to be competitive, but fall to 6 seed Louisville by four points.

Roster

Schedule and results

|-
!colspan=9 style=| Regular Season

|-
!colspan=9 style=| Big East Tournament

|-
!colspan=9 style=| NCAA Tournament

Tournament results
Big East tournament
First Round vs. (7) Providence @ Madison Square Garden, New York, NY - W, 78-68
Semifinals vs. (3) Georgetown @ Madison Square Garden, New York, NY - L, 76-84
NCAA Tournament
First Round vs. (14) Portland @ Bradley Center, Milwaukee, WI - W, 92-58 
Round of 32 vs. (6) Louisville @ Bradley Center, Milwaukee, WI - L, 68-64

Team players in the 1996 NBA draft

References

Villanova Wildcats men's basketball seasons
Villanova
Villanova
Villanova
Villanova